Waverley is an outback locality in the Shire of Boulia, Queensland, Australia.

Geography 
Waverley is in the Channel Country. All watercourses in this area are part of the Lake Eyre drainage basin, and most will dry up before their water reaches Lake Eyre.

The predominant land use is grazing on native vegetation.

Education 
There are no schools in Waverley. The nearest primary schools are in Mount Isa and Dajarra but might be infeasible for a daily commute. The nearest secondary school is in Mount Isa. The Spinifex State College in Mount Isa offers boarding facilities. Other boarding schools or distance education would be options.

Heritage listings 
Waverley has a number of heritage-listed sites, including:
 Ardmore Station: Moonah Creek Hanging Tree

References

Shire of Boulia
Localities in Queensland